Joseph Aslan Cattaui Pasha (1861–1942) was an Egyptian businessman and politician, who served as President of the Jewish community of Cairo from 1924 until his death in 1942.

Life and professional career

Joseph Aslan Cattaui was born in Cairo in 1861, the fourth of eleven children of Aslan Menasce Cattaui Pasha and Grazia Benroubi. He studied engineering at the École Centrale Paris, graduating with a diploma in 1882.

On his return to Egypt, he briefly joined the Ministry of Public Works, before departing to Moravia, where he trained in a sugar refinery. Back in Egypt, he became an associate of Suarès Frères & Co., and contributed to work on the construction of the Helwan railway, the water works at Tanta, the Société des sucreries. In 1904, he founded the Wadi Kom Ombo Company, a huge agricultural and land holding company, in collaboration with Suarès Frères, and Sir Ernest Cassel. In 1920, he co-founded Banque Misr, with Talaat Harb Pacha, and Dr. Fuad Sultan Bey, and joined its board of directors.

Political career

Cattaui was raised to the rank of Pasha in 1912. In 1915, he was elected as member of the legislative assembly, and continued in his mandate until the assembly's dissolution in 1922. A year earlier, he had been appointed to the 32-member commission that worked on drafting the Egyptian constitution. In 1924, he was appointed Minister of Finance, and became Minister of Communication in 1925. From 1927 until his withdrawal from politics in 1939, he was member of the Egyptian Senate.

Personal life

Cattaui's daughter died of typhoid fever at the age of 18 at the end of December, 1906.

Companies
Joseph Cattaui Pasha was involved in, or directed the following companies: 
Société Wadi Kom Ombo (1904- )
Banque Misr (1920- )
Société Cheikh Fadl
Union Fonciere d'Egypte
Compagnie Frigorifique d'Egypte
Société des Halles Centrales
Société des Suceries
Compagnie des Eaux du Caire
Imperial Chemical Industries (Egypt)
National Insurance of Egypt

Works
1920: Pour mes enfants. Paris: L. Carteret. 
1926: L'Égypte: aperçu historique et géographique ; gouvernement et institutions ; vie économique et sociale. Le Caire: Institut Français d'Archéologie Orientale. 
 1927: Le regime des Capitulations en Egypte. Le Caire: Imprimerie de l'Institut francais d'archeologie orientale
1931: Coup d'oeil sur la chronologie de la nation égyptienne. Paris: Plon.
1935: Le Khédive Isma'il et la dette de l'Egypte. Le Caire: Misr 
1943: Les calendriers antiques. Le Caire: Éditions de la revue de Caire

Honours

Egyptian national honours

Foreign honors

References 

1861 births
1942 deaths
Egyptian politicians
Egyptian Jews
Jewish Egyptian politicians
20th-century Egyptian businesspeople
Egyptian bankers
Businesspeople from Cairo
Jews and Judaism in Cairo
École Centrale Paris alumni
Members of the Parliament of Egypt
Pashas
Transport ministers of Egypt
Finance Ministers of Egypt